South Carolina Highway 177 (SC 177) is a  primary state highway in the U.S. state of South Carolina. It connects the community of Wallace with Hamlet, North Carolina.

Route description
SC 177 is a two-lane rural highway that traverses from Wallace at SC 9 to the North Carolina state line.

History
The highway was established in 1960 as a renumbering of SC 77, little has changed since.

Two predecessors existed before the current SC 177 came to existence.  The first appeared from 1930-1936 as a new primary routing from U.S. Route 176 (US 176)/SC 10 in Spartanburg to the North Carolina state line; it eventually became part of SC 9.  The second appeared from 1938-1951 as a new primary routing from US 176 southeast of Pomaria to US 76/SC 2 near Ballentine.  It was adjusted twice, in 1948 extending and replacing SC 664, and in 1950 shifting to meet with US 176/SC 121 split.  It was eventually renumbered as an extension of US 176.

South Carolina Highway 77

South Carolina Highway 77 (SC 77) was established in 1937 as a renumbering of SC 98 from Wallace to the North Carolina state line. In 1960, this became SC 177.

Another SC 77 reappeared only appeared on South Carolina official maps in 1981-1982 as a proposed segment of Interstate 77 (I-77) from US 76/US 378 to I-20. When the freeway eventually opened, it was simply labeled as I-77.

South Carolina Highway 664

South Carolina Highway 664 (SC 664) was established in 1941 or 1942 as a new primary routing between SC 177 and US 176.  In 1948, it was renumbered to SC 177.

Major intersections

See also

References

External links

 
 Former SC 77 at Virginia Highways' South Carolina Highways Annex
 SC 177 at Virginia Highways' South Carolina Highways Annex
 Former SC 664 at Virginia Highways' South Carolina Highways Annex

177
Transportation in Marlboro County, South Carolina